Times College is a private full-time secondary school in Hong Kong.

References

External links

  (in Chinese)

Private schools in Hong Kong
Secondary schools in Hong Kong